Kara Jackson is an American poet, singer, and songwriter.  She is from Oak Park, Illinois.  Jackson was named the United States National Youth Poet Laureate from 2019 to 2020.
Her work has appeared in POETRY, Frontier Poetry, Rookie Mag, Nimrod Literary Journal, The Lily, and Saint Heron.

Publications

 Bloodstone Cowboy (Haymarket Books, 2019)

Discography

Studio Albums 
2019 - A Song for Every Chamber of the Heart, an EP.
2023 - Why Does the Earth Give Us People to Love?, debut album

References

Year of birth missing (living people)
Living people
American Poets Laureate
People from Oak Park, Illinois
National Youth Poet Laureate